Walkley is a surname. Notable people with the surname include:

 Arthur Bingham Walkley (1855–1926), English civil servant and drama critic
 Edwin Walkley (1876–1950), Australian cricketer
 Frank Walkley (1921–2009), American state politician
 James Clark Walkley (1817–1890), American state politician
 Laura May Walkley (born 1991), Welsh footballer
 PT Walkley, American singer-songwriter
 R. Barrie Walkley (born 1944), American foreign service officer
 Thomas Walkley (fl.1618–1658), English publisher and bookseller
 William Walkley (1896–1976), New Zealand oil company executive